The Shaheed Zulfiqar Ali Bhutto Medical University (SZABMU) is a public university in Islamabad, Pakistan. Established on 21 March 2013, it offers undergraduate and postgraduate courses of medicine, surgery, dentistry, basic medical sciences and allied health professions.

Constituent Institutions 
 Federal Medical College (Offers MBBS)
 School of Dentistry (Offers BDS)

Affiliated Institutions 
 Rawal Institute of Health Sciences
 Yusra Medical and Dental College
 HBS Medical and Dental College
 Islamabad Medical and Dental College
 Bashir Institute of Health Science
 Prime Institute of Health Sciences
 Islamabad Institute of Health Sciences
 Institute of Health and Management Sciences

References

External links 
SZABMU official website

Public universities and colleges in Pakistan
Universities and colleges in Islamabad
Educational institutions established in 2013
2013 establishments in Pakistan
Medical colleges in Islamabad
Islamabad Capital Territory
Memorials to Zulfikar Ali Bhutto